Anel Oosthuizen (born 22 April 1995) is a South African race walker. She competed in the women's 20 kilometres walk event at the 2016 Summer Olympics. She finished in 63rd place with a time of 1:45:06.

References

External links
 

1995 births
Living people
South African female racewalkers
Place of birth missing (living people)
Athletes (track and field) at the 2016 Summer Olympics
Olympic athletes of South Africa
South African Athletics Championships winners